Grosotto is a comune (municipality) in the Province of Sondrio in the Italian region Lombardy, located about  northeast of Milan and about  northeast of Sondrio, on the border with Switzerland.

Grosotto borders the following municipalities: Brusio (Switzerland), Grosio, Mazzo di Valtellina, Monno, Poschiavo (Switzerland), Vervio.

References

Cities and towns in Lombardy